Naga Hospital Ward is a ward located under Nagaland's capital city, Kohima. The ward falls under the designated Ward No. 10 of the Kohima Municipal Council.

Education
Educational Institutions in Naga Hospital Ward:

Schools 
 Assembly of God High School

See also
 Municipal Wards of Kohima

References

External links
 Map of Kohima Ward No. 10

Kohima
Wards of Kohima